Chernin is a surname. Notable people with the surname include:

Alexander Chernin (born 1960), Hungarian chess player
Cayle Chernin (1947-2011), Canadian actress
Elena Kats-Chernin (born 1957), Australian composer
Kim Chernin (born 1940), American author
Peter Chernin (born 1951), American businessman and investor

See also
Odette Tchernine